Bruno Mario Lavezzi (born 8 May 1948) is an Italian singer-songwriter, composer, record producer and guitarist.

Life and career 
Born in Milan, he studied piano and guitar at the Scuola Civica di Milano.  He started his career in 1963, as the singer and guitarist for the band The Trappers. In 1966, following the dissolution of the band, he replaced Riki Maiocchi in the I Camaleonti until 1968, when he had to leave the band after being drafted into the Italian army. In 1969 he debuted as a composer with the Dik Dik hit "Il primo giorno di primavera". In 1970 he co-founded the pop-rock group Flora Fauna e Cemento, then in 1974 he was part of the progressive rock musical project Il Volo. In the second half of the 1970s Lavezzi started a solo career as singer-songwriter; he also started collaborating as a composer and a record producer for several albums of Loredana Bertè. He later wrote songs for many notable artists, including Lucio Dalla, Gianni Morandi, Anna Oxa, Spagna, Marcella Bella, Ornella Vanoni, Fiorella Mannoia, and scored the 1984 Carlo Vanzina comedy film  Amarsi un po', which starred Tahnee Welch.

Lavezzi is the uncle of Italo-disco one hit wonder Diana Est.

Discography 

 Albums

 1974 - Il Volo
 1976 - Iaia
 1978 - Filobus
 1979 - Cartolina
 1983 - Agrodolce
 1984 - Guardandoti, sfiorandoti
 1991 - Voci
 1993 - Voci 2
 1997 - Voci e chitarre
 1999 - Senza catene
 2004 - Passionalità
 2009 - A più voci
 2011 - L'amore è quando c'è

References

External links 
 
 Mario Lavezzi at Discogs

Singers from Milan
1948 births
Italian pop singers
Italian composers
Italian male composers
Italian singer-songwriters
Living people
Italian record producers
Italian guitarists